Adamki may refer to the following places:
Adamki, Kuyavian-Pomeranian Voivodeship (north-central Poland)
Adamki, Łódź Voivodeship (central Poland)
Adamki, Pomeranian Voivodeship (north Poland)